Ophiolites are sequences of mafic to ultramafic rock generally believed to represent ancient oceanic lithosphere. They are distributed all across the world being all of them located at present or past orogenic belts, sites of mountain building processes.

Ophiolites are common in orogenic belts of Mesozoic age, like those formed by the closure of the Tethys Ocean. Ophiolites in Archean and Paleoproterozoic domains are rare.

Mediterranean and Peri-Arabic
 Morais ophiolite complex, Portugal
 Internal Ligurian Ophiolites in Northern Apennines, Italy
 Troodos Ophiolite in the Troodos Mountains of Cyprus
 Kizildag ophiolite, southern Turkey
Mirdita Ophiolite, middle Jurassic ophiolite in northern Albania between the Apulian and Pelagonian subcontinents in the Balkan Peninsula
 Cap Corse ophiolite, Corsica, France
 Vourinos and Pindos Ophiolites in Northern Greece and their northern extensions (numerous ophiolite bodies) in Albania, Serbia and Bosnia 
 Ronda peridotite, Southern Spain
 Lherz Massif, France
 Beni Bousera ophiolite, Morocco
 Golyamo Kamenyane Complex, Bulgaria
 Semail Ophiolite in Oman and the United Arab Emirates
 Makran Ophiolite, Makran, Iran and Pakistan
 Zagros ophiolite, Zagros mountains, Iran
 Iraq Zagros ophiolites, Zagros mountains, Iraq, includes; Cretaceous ophiolites (Mawat, Penjwen, Pushtashan, Hassanbig and Bulfat) and Eocene ophiolites (Rayat and Qalander).

Tibetan
Dongbo ophiolite
Loubusa ophiolite
Purang ophiolite

Circumpacific

Asia-Pacific
 Zambales Ophiolite in western Luzon, Philippines
 Angat Ophiolite in eastern Luzon, Philippines
 Rapu-rapu Ophiolite Complex in eastern Philippines
 Southeast Bohol Ophiolite Complex in Bohol, Philippines
 Macquarie Island, Tasmania, Australia
 Palawan Ophiolite, western Philippines
 Papuan ophiolite in Papua New Guinea
 Yakuno, Horokanai, and Poroshiri, three full ophiolite sequences in Japan
 Dun Mountain Ophiolite Belt, South Island, New Zealand
 Naga-Manipur Ophiolite Complex, India

North American Cordillera
Coast Range Ophiolite, in the California Coast Ranges from Santa Barbara through San Francisco Counties, California.
Kings River ophiolite, southwest Sierra Nevada foothills, California
 Point Sal ophiolite, Point Sal, Santa Barbara County, Southern California.
 California ophiolite, Smartville Block of the Sierra Nevada, and the Klamath Mountains, northern California
 Josephine Ophiolite in Southern Oregon
 Canyon Mountain and Sparta Complexes ophiolite, Northeastern Oregon
 Payson Ophiolite, Payson, Arizona.
 Metchosin Igneous Complex ophiolite, southern Vancouver Island, British Columbia, Canada
 Ingalls Terrane ophiolite, Cascade Mountains,  Washington
 Fidalgo Complex ophiolite,  Skagit County, Washington.

Mexico and the Caribbean
Olivos ophiolite, Chihuahua, Mexico
Vizcaino ophiolite, Baja California Sur, Mexico
Cuban ophiolititic belt
Puerto Rican ophiolite

Andes
La Tetilla Ophiolite Complex, near Popayán, Colombian Cordillera Occidental (Andes)
Famatinian Ophiolites, near Famatina in the Argentine Andes.
Tapo ophiolite, Peru
Taitao ophiolite
Rocas Verdes ophiolites, Patagonian Andes, Chile
Tortuga ophiolite complex
Sarmiento ophiolite complex

Brazil
Quatipuru ophiolite, Brazil
Cerro Mantiqueiras Ophiolite, Rio Grande do Sul, Brazil

Eastern North America
 Betts Cove, St. Anthony, Little Port, Advocate, Gander River, Pipestone Pond, Great Bend and Annieopsquotch ophiolites in Newfoundland
 Bay of Islands Ophiolite in Gros Morne National Park, Newfoundland, named a UNESCO World Heritage Site in 1987 because of its superbly exposed complete ophiolite stratigraphic sequence
 Thetford Mines ophiolite Complex (Thetford Mines, Cantons de l'Est, Québec, Canada)
 Asbestos ophiolite (Asbestos, Cantons de l'Est, Québec, Canada)
 Mont Orford ophiolite (Magog, Cantons de l'Est, Québec, Canada)
 Mont Albert ophiolite (Gaspésie, Québec, Canada)
 Maryland ophiolite in the central Appalachian orogen,  Baltimore, Maryland.

Northern Europe
 Ballantrae Ophiolite Complex, Girvan-Ballantrae area, SW Ayrshire, Scotland
 Jormua Ophiolite, Finland
 Karmøy ophiolite, Scandinavian Mountains, Norway
 Leka Ophiolite, Scandinavian Mountains, Norway
 Løkken Ophiolite, Scandinavian Mountains, Norway
 Nuttio Ophiolite, Finland
 Solund-Stavfjord Ophiolite, Scandinavian Mountains, Norway
 Lizard complex in Cornwall, United Kingdom
 Outokumpu Ophiolite, Finland
 Shetland Ophiolite, Unst and Fetlar, Shetland, Scotland

References

5 - Forearc extension and sea-floor spreading in the Thetford Mines Ophiolite complex (link : https://scholar.google.com/citations?view_op=view_citation&hl=fr&user=sWm-LdoAAAAJ&cstart=20&sortby=pubdate&citation_for_view=sWm-LdoAAAAJ:B2rIPIGFPLEC)

6 - Structural evolution of the Thetford Mines Ophiolite Complex, Canada: implications for the southern Québec ophiolitic belt (link : 
https://scholar.google.com/citations?view_op=view_citation&hl=fr&user=sWm-LdoAAAAJ&cstart=20&sortby=pubdate&citation_for_view=sWm-LdoAAAAJ:u0Mu_IsstPMC)

+
Ophiolite, List
Ophiolites